Llyn Bodgynydd is a lake in the Gwydir Forest in North Wales.

It is locally known as "Llyn Bod", or "Bod Mawr" (big), distinguishing it from a nearby, but much smaller lake ("Bod Bach" or "Cors Bodgynydd reservoir") to the north-east.  Water from the larger lake flows to the smaller.

Both these lakes were dammed to create reservoirs to produce water to turn the large water wheel at the nearby Pandora mine, though they now hold less water than they once did due to the demolition of Bod Bach dam, and the altering of the sluice control at Bod Mawr in 1970.

An area beside the smaller lake has been designated the Cors Bodgynydd Nature Reserve due to the rich variety of plant and animal life there.

The lakeside affords good views of the adjacent hills, and fishing rights are held by Llanrwst Fishing Club.

References
The Lakes of Eryri, by Geraint Roberts, Gwasg Carreg Gwalch, 1985

Capel Curig
Trefriw
Bodgynydd
Bodgynydd
Nature reserves in Conwy County Borough